Stadium is a St. Louis MetroLink station. This station serves Busch Stadium, home of the St. Louis Cardinals, Cupples Station, and Ballpark Village in downtown St. Louis, Missouri.

The Stadium station sits at the west portal of the historic St. Louis Freight Tunnel. Constructed in 1874 to carry trains between the Eads Bridge and the Mill Creek Valley rail yards, it saw its last train (Amtrak) in 1974. Refurbishment of the tunnels began in 1991 in preparation for the opening of MetroLink, which uses the original route to connect Illinois and Missouri via downtown St. Louis.

In 2013, Metro's Arts in Transit program commissioned the work Out of the Park by Andrews/LeFevre Studios for installation in the station. The anodized aluminum sculpture is a dynamic abstraction of a baseball being hit “out of the park” and echoes the shape and proportions of the Gateway Arch.

Station layout
Both platforms are accessed via a set of stairs from Spruce Street and a set of ramps from Clark Avenue. The westbound platform can also be accessed via a set of stairs from Clark Avenue.

References

External links
 St. Louis Metro
Clark Avenue entrance from Google Maps Street View
Spruce Street entrance from Google Maps Street View
Stadium station satellite view

MetroLink stations in St. Louis
Red Line (St. Louis MetroLink)
Blue Line (St. Louis MetroLink)
Railway stations in the United States opened in 1993
1993 establishments in Missouri